Syracuse is a town in Turkey Creek Township, Kosciusko County, in the U.S. state of Indiana. The population was 3,079 at the 2020 census. Syracuse is the location of Lake Syracuse and the nearby, larger Lake Wawasee, in addition to several other lakes in the region. The National Weather Service operates a Weather Forecast Office in the town. It serves Northern Indiana.

History
Syracuse was laid out in 1837. It was likely named after the city of Syracuse, New York. The Syracuse post office was established in 1837.

Geography
Syracuse is located at  (41.423389, -85.749887).

Demographics

2010 census
At the 2010 census, there were 2,810 people, 1,158 households and 729 families living in the town. The racial makeup of the town was 95.7% White, 0.6% African American, 0.1% Native American, 0.7% Asian, 1.6% from other races, and 1.3% from two or more races. Hispanic or Latino of any race were 5.2% of the population.

There were 1,158 households, of which 31.8% had children under the age of 18 living with them, 42.6% were married couples living together, 13.2% had a female householder with no husband present, 7.2% had a male householder with no wife present, and 37.0% were non-families. 30.1% of all households were made up of individuals, and 11.1% had someone living alone who was 65 years of age or older. The average household size was 2.43 and the average family size was 2.98.

The median age in the town was 37.4 years. 25.1% of residents were under the age of 18; 8.1% were between the ages of 18 and 24; 26.4% were from 25 to 44; 27.2% were from 45 to 64; and 13.1% were 65 years of age or older. The gender makeup of the town was 50.4% male and 49.6% female.

2000 census
At the 2000 census, there were 3,038 people, 1,236 households and 779 families living in the town. The racial makeup of the town was 93.75% White, 0.86% African American, 0.36% Native American, 0.56% Asian, 0.03% Pacific Islander, 2.67% from other races, and 1.78% from two or more races. Hispanic or Latino of any race were 4.64% of the population.

There were 1,236 households, of which 31.4% had children under the age of 18, 46.1% were married couples living together, 11.6% had a female householder with no husband present, and 36.9% were non-families. Of all households, 30.1% were made up of individuals, and 11.4% had someone living alone who was 65 years of age or older. The average household size was 2.41 and the average family size was 2.98.

26.4% of the population were under the age of 18, 9.5% from 18 to 24, 27.9% from 25 to 44, 22.0% from 45 to 64, and 14.3% who were 65 years of age or older. The median age was 35 years. For every 100 females, there were 95.2 males. For every 100 females age 18 and over, there were 90.5 males.

The median household income was $40,000 and the median family income was $45,968. Males had a median income of $34,526 compared with $22,820 for females. The per capita income for the town was $18,822. About 3.2% of families and 5.7% of the population were below the poverty line, including 6.9% of those under age 18 and 4.1% of those age 65 or over.

Education
Syracuse is the headquarters of the Wawasee School Corporation teaching students in K-12. It is the location of Administration, Wawasee High School, Syracuse Elementary, and Wawasee Middle School. Other schools in the corporation are located in the towns of Milford and North Webster.

The town has a lending library, the Syracuse-Turkey Creek Township Public Library.

References

External links
 Town of Syracuse, Indiana website
 Wawasee School Corporation
 Syracuse-Wawasee Chamber of Commerce
 https://visitkosciuskocounty.org

Towns in Kosciusko County, Indiana
Towns in Indiana